Falalop is an island adjacent to the Ulithi Atoll in the western Pacific Ocean, approximately  east of Yap. It is part of the Yap State within the Federated States of Micronesia.

Overview 

Falalop is one of four islets, that make up the coral atoll of Ifalik. It is the largest islet,  in area, triangular in shape, surrounded by a 
It has the largest population of the four inhabited islets of Ifalik, between 500 to 600 people.

Ulithi Airport is located on the island, as well as one of the three Yap State public high schools.

Transportation 

The Ulithi Civil Airfield (IATA code ULI, FAA Identifier TT02) serves as the main air link with the rest of Federated States of Micronesia. Air services are provided by Pacific Missionary Aviation, although there are no regularly scheduled flights.

Education
Public schools
 Yap Outer Islands High School

References

External links 

Islands of Yap